The Amaravi were a Bantu people, living around Lake Nyasa in what is now Malawi in the 15th century. They founded a dynasty known as the Maravi Empire. The Amaravi, who eventually became known as the Chewa (a word possibly derived from a term meaning "foreigner"), migrated to Malawi from the region of the modern day Republic of Congo.

References

Bantu peoples
Ethnic groups in Malawi
History of Malawi